Shuhada' Sadaqat (previously Magda Davitt; born Sinéad Marie Bernadette O'Connor on 8 December 1966) is an Irish singer-songwriter. Her debut album, The Lion and the Cobra, was released in 1987 and charted internationally. Her second album, I Do Not Want What I Haven't Got received glowing reviews upon release and became her biggest success, selling over seven million copies worldwide. Its lead single, "Nothing Compares 2 U" (written by Prince), was named the number one world single in 1990 by the Billboard Music Awards.

She has released ten studio albums: 1992's Am I Not Your Girl? and 1994's Universal Mother both went gold in the UK, 2000's Faith and Courage received gold status in Australia, and 2005's Throw Down Your Arms went gold in Ireland. Her work also includes songs for films, collaborations with many other artists, and appearances at charity fundraising concerts. Her 2021 memoir Rememberings was a best seller.

Throughout her music career she has been unabashedly honest about her spiritual journey, activism, socio-political views, as well as her trauma and mental health struggles.

In 1999, she was ordained as a priest by the Latin Tridentine Church, a sect that is not recognized by the mainstream Catholic Church. She consistently speaks out on issues related to child abuse, human rights, anti-racism, organised religion, and women's rights.
In 2017, O'Connor changed her name to Magda Davitt. After converting to Islam in 2018, she changed it to Shuhada' Sadaqat. However, she continues to record and perform under her birth name.

Early life
O'Connor was born in the Cascia House Nursing Home at 13 Pembroke Road, Dublin, on 8 December 1966. She was named Sinéad after Sinéad de Valera, the mother of the doctor presiding over the delivery, Eamonn de Valera, and Bernadette in honour of Saint Bernadette of Lourdes. She is the third of five children; her siblings are novelist Joseph, Eimear, John, and Eoin.

Her parents are John Oliver “Seán” O'Connor, a structural engineer later turned barrister and chairperson of the Divorce Action Group, and Johanna Marie O'Grady (1939-1985) who married in the Church of Our Lady of Good Counsel, Drimnagh, Dublin in 1960. In 1979, O'Connor left her mother and went to live with her father and his new wife divorcee Viola Margaret Suiter (née Cook) who had gotten married in Alexandria, Virginia, United States three years prior in 1976. At the age of 15, her shoplifting and truancy led to her being placed for eighteen months in a Magdalene asylum called the Grianán Training Centre run by the Order of Our Lady of Charity. In some ways, she thrived there, especially in the development of her writing and music, but she also chafed under the imposed conformity. Unruly students there were sometimes sent to sleep in the adjoining nursing home, an experience of which she later commented, "I have never—and probably will never—experience such panic and terror and agony over anything."

O'Connor's mother Marie died in a car accident on 10 February 1985 aged 45 as she lost control of her car on an icy road and crashed into a bus, when O'Connor was eighteen.

In June 1993, O'Connor wrote a public letter in The Irish Times which asked people to "stop hurting" her: "If only I can fight off the voices of my parents / and gather a sense of self-esteem / Then I'll be able to REALLY sing ..." The letter repeated accusations of abuse by her parents as a child which O'Connor had made in interviews. Her brother Joseph defended their father to the newspaper but agreed regarding their mother's "extreme and violent abuse, both emotional and physical". O'Connor said that month, "Our family is very messed up. We can't communicate with each other. We are all in agony. I for one am in agony."

Musical career

1980s 
One of the volunteers at Grianán was the sister of Paul Byrne, drummer for the band In Tua Nua, who heard O'Connor singing "Evergreen" by Barbra Streisand. She recorded a song with them called "Take My Hand" but they felt that at 15, she was too young to join the band. Through an ad she placed in Hot Press in mid-1984, she met Colm Farrelly. Together they recruited a few other members and formed a band called Ton Ton Macoute. The band moved to Waterford briefly while O'Connor attended Newtown School, but she soon dropped out of school and followed them to Dublin, where their performances received positive reviews. Their sound was inspired by Farrelly's interest in world music, though most observers thought O'Connor's singing and stage presence were the band's strongest features.

O'Connor's time as singer for Ton Ton Macoute brought her to the attention of the music industry, and she was eventually signed by Ensign Records. She also acquired an experienced manager, Fachtna O'Ceallaigh, former head of U2's Mother Records. Soon after she was signed, she embarked on her first major assignment, providing the vocals for the song "Heroine", which she co-wrote with U2's guitarist the Edge for the soundtrack to the film Captive. O'Ceallaigh, who had been fired by U2 for complaining about them in an interview, was outspoken with his views on music and politics, and O'Connor adopted the same habits; she defended the actions of the Provisional IRA and said U2's music was "bombastic". She later retracted her IRA comments saying they were based on nonsense, and that she was "too young to understand the tense situation in Northern Ireland properly".

Her first album The Lion and the Cobra was "a sensation" when it was released in 1987 on Chrysalis Records, and it reached gold record status, earning a Best Female Rock Vocal Performance Grammy nomination. The single "Mandinka" was a big college radio hit in the United States, and "I Want Your (Hands on Me)" received both college and urban play in a remixed form that featured rapper MC Lyte. In her first US network television appearance, O'Connor sang "Mandinka" on Late Night with David Letterman in 1988. The single "Troy" was also released as a single in the UK, Ireland, and the Netherlands, where it reached number 5 on the Dutch Top 40 chart.

O'Connor named Bob Dylan, David Bowie, Bob Marley, Siouxsie and the Banshees and the Pretenders as the artists who influenced her on her debut album.
In 1989 O'Connor joined  frontman Matt Johnson as a guest vocalist on the band's album Mind Bomb, which spawned the duet "Kingdom of Rain".

1990s
Her second album – 1990's I Do Not Want What I Haven't Got – gained considerable attention and mostly positive reviews: it was rated "second best album of the year" by the NME. She was praised for her voice and her original songs. She was also noted for her appearance: her trademark shaved head, often angry expression, and sometimes shapeless or unusual clothing.

The album I Do Not Want What I Haven't Got featured Marco Pirroni and Kevin Mooney, of Adam and the Ants fame, and contained her international breakthrough hit "Nothing Compares 2 U", a song written by Prince and originally recorded and released by a side project of his, the Family.

Hank Shocklee, producer for Public Enemy, remixed the album's next single, "The Emperor's New Clothes", for a 12-inch that was coupled with the Celtic funk of "I Am Stretched on Your Grave". Pre-dating but included on I Do Not Want What I Haven't Got was also "Jump in the River", which originally appeared on the Married to the Mob soundtrack; the 12-inch version of the single had included a remix featuring performance artist Karen Finley. Also in 1990, O'Connor starred in a small independent Irish movie Hush-a-Bye Baby directed in Derry by Margo Harkin.

In 1990, she joined many other guests for former Pink Floyd member Roger Waters' massive performance of The Wall in Berlin. (In 1996, she would guest on Broken China, a solo album by Richard Wright of Pink Floyd.) In 1991, her take on Elton John's "Sacrifice" was acclaimed as one of the best efforts on the tribute album Two Rooms: Celebrating the Songs of Elton John & Bernie Taupin.

In 1990, she contributed a cover of "You Do Something to Me" to the Cole Porter tribute/AIDS fundraising album Red Hot + Blue produced by the Red Hot Organization. Red Hot + Blue was followed by the release of Am I Not Your Girl?, an album of standards and torch songs that she had listened to while growing up. The album received mixed-to-poor reviews, and was a commercial disappointment in light of the success of her previous work.

Also in 1990, she was criticised after she stated that she would not perform if the United States national anthem was played before one of her concerts. Frank Sinatra threatened to "kick her in the ass". After receiving four Grammy Award nominations, she withdrew her name from consideration. Although nominated for the Brit Award for International Female Solo Artist (which she won) she did not attend the awards ceremony, but did accept the Irish IRMA in February 1991.

She spent the following months studying Bel canto singing with teacher Frank Merriman at the Parnell School of Music. In an interview with The Guardian published 3 May 1993 she reported that her singing lessons with Merriman were the only therapy she was receiving, describing Merriman as "the most amazing teacher in the universe."

Also in 1992, she contributed backing vocals on the track "Come Talk To Me", and shared vocals on the single "Blood of Eden" from the studio album Us by Peter Gabriel. Gabriel invited her to join his ongoing Secret World Tour in May 1993, to sing these songs and more in an elaborate stage setting. O'Connor traveled and performed as a guest artist. She was seen at Gabriel's side at the 1993 MTV Video Music Awards in September. While in Los Angeles, she took too many sleeping pills, inciting media conjecture about a suicide attempt. She said she "was in a bad way emotionally at the time, but it wasn't a suicide attempt." She left the tour suddenly, causing Gabriel to scramble for a replacement singer. Decades later, she wrote in her memoir Rememberings that she left Gabriel because he treated her casually, and would not make a commitment.

The 1993 soundtrack to the film In the Name of the Father featured O'Connor's "You Made Me the Thief of Your Heart", with significant contributions from U2 frontman Bono.

Her more conventional Universal Mother album (1994) did not succeed in restoring her mass appeal; however, the music videos for the first and second singles, "Fire on Babylon" and "Famine", were nominated for a Grammy Award for Best Short Form Music Video. She toured with Lollapalooza in 1995, but dropped out when she became pregnant. The Gospel Oak EP followed in 1997, and featured songs based in an acoustic setting.

In 1994, she appeared in A Celebration: The Music of Pete Townshend and The Who, also known as Daltrey Sings Townshend. This was a two-night concert at Carnegie Hall produced by Roger Daltrey of the Who in celebration of his 50th birthday. A CD and a VHS video of the concert were issued in 1994, followed by a DVD in 1998.

She appeared in Neil Jordan's The Butcher Boy in 1997, playing the Virgin Mary.

In 1998, she worked again with the Red Hot Organization to co-produce and perform on Red Hot + Rhapsody.

2000s

Faith and Courage was released in 2000, including the single "No Man's Woman", and featured contributions from Wyclef Jean of the Fugees and Dave Stewart of Eurythmics.

Her 2002 album, Sean-Nós Nua, marked a departure in that O'Connor interpreted or, in her own words, "sexed up" traditional Irish folk songs, including several in the Irish language. In Sean-Nós Nua, she covered a well-known Canadian folk song, "Peggy Gordon", interpreted as a song of lesbian, rather than heterosexual, love. In her documentary, Song of Hearts Desire, she stated that her inspiration for the song was her friend, a lesbian who sang the song to lament the loss of her partner.

In 2003, she contributed a track to the Dolly Parton tribute album Just Because I'm a Woman, a cover of Parton's "Dagger Through the Heart". That same year, she also featured on three songs of Massive Attack's album 100th Window before releasing her double album, She Who Dwells in the Secret Place of the Most High Shall Abide Under the Shadow of the Almighty. This compilation contained one disc of demos and previously unreleased tracks and one disc of a live concert recording. Directly after the album's release, O'Connor announced that she was retiring from music.
Collaborations, a compilation album of guest appearances, was released in 2005—featuring tracks recorded with Peter Gabriel, Massive Attack, Jah Wobble, Terry Hall, Moby, Bomb the Bass, the Edge, U2, and The The.

Ultimately, after a brief period of inactivity and a bout with fibromyalgia, her retirement proved to be short-lived. O'Connor stated in an interview with Harp magazine that she had only intended to retire from making mainstream pop/rock music, and after dealing with her fibromyalgia she chose to move into other musical styles. The reggae album Throw Down Your Arms appeared in late 2005.

On 8 November 2006, O'Connor performed seven songs from her upcoming album Theology at The Sugar Club in Dublin. Thirty fans were given the opportunity to win pairs of tickets to attend along with music industry critics. The performance was released in 2008 as Live at the Sugar Club deluxe CD/DVD package sold exclusively on her website.

O'Connor released two songs from her album Theology to download for free from her official website: "If You Had a Vineyard" and "Jeremiah (Something Beautiful)". The album, a collection of covered and original Rastafari spiritual songs, was released in June 2007. The first single from the album, the Tim Rice and Andrew Lloyd Webber classic "I Don't Know How to Love Him", was released on 30 April 2007. To promote the album, O'Connor toured extensively in Europe and North America. She also appeared on two tracks of the new Ian Brown album The World Is Yours, including the anti-war single "Illegal Attacks".

2010s
In January 2010, O'Connor performed a duet with R&B singer Mary J. Blige produced by former A Tribe Called Quest member Ali Shaheed Muhammad of O'Connor's song "This Is To Mother You" (first recorded by O'Connor on her 1997 Gospel Oak EP). The proceeds of the song's sales were donated to the organisation GEMS (Girls Educational and Mentoring Services).
In 2012 the song "Lay Your Head Down", written by Brian Byrne and Glenn Close for the soundtrack of the film Albert Nobbs and performed by O'Connor, was nominated for a Golden Globe Award for Best Original Song.

 
In 2011, O'Connor worked on recording a new album, titled Home, to be released in the beginning of 2012, titled How About I Be Me (and You Be You)?, with the first single being "The Wolf is Getting Married". She planned an extensive tour in support of the album but suffered a serious breakdown between December 2011 and March 2012, resulting in the tour and all other musical activities for the rest of 2012 being cancelled. O'Connor resumed touring in 2013 with The Crazy Baldhead Tour. The second single "4th and Vine" was released on 18 February 2013.

In February 2014, it was revealed that O'Connor had been recording a new album of original material, titled The Vishnu Room, consisting of romantic love songs. In early June 2014, it O'Connor's new album was retitled I'm Not Bossy, I'm the Boss, with an 11 August release date. The title derives from the Ban Bossy campaign that took place earlier the same year. The album's first single is entitled "Take Me to Church".

In November 2014, O'Connor's management was taken over by Simon Napier-Bell and Björn de Water. On 15 November, O'Connor joined the charity supergroup Band Aid 30 along with other British and Irish pop acts, recording a new version of the track "Do They Know It's Christmas?" at Sarm West Studios in Notting Hill, London, to raise money for the West African Ebola virus epidemic.

2020s 
On 4 June 2021, O'Connor announced her immediate retirement from the music industry. While her final studio album, No Veteran Dies Alone, was due to be released in 2022, O'Connor stated that she would not be touring or promoting it. Announcing the news on Twitter, she said "This is to announce my retirement from touring and from working in the record business. I've gotten older and I'm tired. So it's time for me to hang up my nipple tassels, having truly given my all. NVDA in 2022 will be my last release. And there'll be no more touring or promo." Later, on 7 June, she retracted this statement, describing the original announcement as "a knee-jerk reaction" to an insensitive interview, and that she would be doing her already scheduled 2022 tour.

Controversies

Saturday Night Live performance

On 3 October 1992, O'Connor appeared on Saturday Night Live as a musical guest. She sang an a cappella version of Bob Marley's "War", which she intended as a protest against sexual abuse of children in the Catholic Church, referring to child abuse rather than racism. She then presented a photo of Pope John Paul II to the camera while singing the word "evil", after which she tore the photo into pieces, said "Fight the real enemy", and threw the pieces towards the camera. The incident occurred nine years before John Paul II acknowledged the sexual abuse within the Church.

Saturday Night Live had no foreknowledge of O'Connor's plan; during the dress rehearsal, she held up a photo of a refugee child. NBC Vice-president of Late Night Rick Ludwin recalled that when he saw O'Connor's action, he "literally jumped out of [his] chair". SNL writer Paula Pell recalled personnel in the control booth discussing the cameras cutting away. The audience was completely silent, with no booing or applause; executive producer Lorne Michaels recalled that "the air went out the studio". He ordered that the applause sign not be used.

A nationwide audience saw O'Connor's live performance, which the New York Daily Newss cover called a "Holy Terror". NBC received more than 500 calls on Sunday and 400 more on Monday, with all but seven criticising O'Connor; the network received 4,400 calls in total. Contrary to rumour, NBC was not fined by the Federal Communications Commission for O'Connor's act, as the FCC has no regulatory power over such behaviour.  NBC did not edit the performance out of the West coast tape-delayed broadcast that night. , NBC broadcasts reruns of the episode using footage from the dress rehearsal.

During his opening monologue the following week, Catholic-raised host Joe Pesci held up the photo, explaining that he had taped it back together, to huge applause. Pesci also said that if it had been his show, "I would have gave [sic] her such a smack".

In a 2002 interview with Salon, when asked if she would change anything about the SNL appearance, O'Connor replied, "Hell, no!" In her 2021 book Rememberings, O'Connor said of the incident: "Everyone wants a pop star, see? But I am a protest singer. I just had stuff to get off my chest. I had no desire for fame."

Madonna's reaction
When Catholic-raised Madonna appeared later that season on SNL, after singing "Bad Girl", she held up a photo of Joey Buttafuoco and, saying "fight the real enemy", tore it up. Madonna also roundly attacked O'Connor in the press for the incident, telling the Irish Times: "I think there is a better way to present her ideas rather than ripping up an image that means a lot to other people." She added, "If she is against the Roman Catholic Church and she has a problem with them, I think she should talk about it." The New York Times called it "professional jealousy" and wrote:

Bob Guccione, Jr. in a 1993 Spin editorial was adamant in his defence of O'Connor, writing:

In November 1991, a year prior to the incident, O'Connor had told Spin magazine:

Bob Dylan tribute performance
Two weeks after the Saturday Night Live appearance, she was set to perform "I Believe in You" at the Bob Dylan 30th Anniversary tribute concert in Madison Square Garden. She was greeted by a thundering mixture of cheers and jeers. During the booing, Kris Kristofferson told her not to "let the bastards get you down", to which she replied, "I'm not down." The noise eventually became so loud that O'Connor saw no point in starting the scheduled song. She called for the keyboard player to stop and the microphone to be turned up, and then screamed over the audience with an improvised, shouted rendition of "War", which she stopped just after mentioning child abuse, emphasizing the point of her previous action. She then looked straight to the audience for a second and left the stage. Kristofferson then comforted her, as she cried.

After Dark appearance

In January 1995, O'Connor made an appearance on the British late-night television programme After Dark during an episode about sexual abuse and the Catholic church in Ireland. The discussion included a Dominican friar and another representative of the Catholic church, along with former Taoiseach Garret FitzGerald. Host Helena Kennedy described the event:

Open letter to Miley Cyrus
O'Connor published an open letter, on her own website, to American singer and actress Miley Cyrus on 2 October 2013 in which she warned Cyrus of the treatment of women in the music industry and alleged that sexuality is a factor in this, which was in response to Cyrus' music video for her song "Wrecking Ball". O'Connor stated:

Remarks about Prince
Speaking about her relationship with Prince in an interview with Norwegian station NRK in November 2014 she said, "I did meet him a couple of times.  We didn't get on at all.  In fact we had a punch-up." She continued: "He summoned me to his house after 'Nothing Compares 2U'. I made it without him.  I’d never met him.  He summoned me to his house – and it's foolish to do this to an Irish woman – he said he didn't like me saying bad words in interviews. So I told him to fuck off....He got quite violent. I had to escape out of his house at 5 in the morning. He packed a bigger punch than mine." In a 2004 interview with Graham Norton, O'Connor claimed that the story was "much exaggerated by the press" and referred to him as "a sweet guy". In her 2021 memoir Rememberings, O'Connor described her meeting with Prince in detail, which ranged from having his butler serve soup repeatedly despite no desire for soup to hitting her with a hard object placed in a pillowcase after wanting a pillow fight to stalking her with his car after she left the mansion.

Tweets about non-Muslims

After her conversion to Islam, O'Connor called those who were not Muslims "disgusting" and criticised Christian and Jewish theologians on Twitter in November 2018. She wrote: "What I'm about to say is something so racist I never thought my soul could ever feel it. But truly I never wanna spend time with white people again (if that's what non-muslims are called). Not for one moment, for any reason. They are disgusting."

Later that month, O'Connor stated that her remarks were made in an attempt to force Twitter to close down her account. In September 2019, she apologised for the remarks, saying "They were not true at the time and they are not true now. I was triggered as a result of Islamophobia dumped on me. I apologize for hurt caused. That was one of many crazy tweets lord knows."

Personal life

Name
In 2017, she changed her legal name to Magda Davitt, saying in an interview that she wished to be "free of the patriarchal slave names. Free of the parental curses." On her conversion to Islam in October 2018, she adopted the name Shuhada, and before mid-2019 also changed her surname from Davitt to Sadaqat.

Personal and public image
While her shaved head was initially an assertion against traditional views of women, years later, O'Connor said she had begun to grow her hair back, but that after being asked if she was Enya, O'Connor shaved it off again. "I don't feel like me unless I have my hair shaved. So even when I'm an old lady, I'm going to shave it."

Marriages and children
O'Connor has had four children and has been married four times.  She had her first son, Jake, in 1987 with her first husband, music producer John Reynolds, who co-produced several of her albums, including Universal Mother. Reynolds and O'Connor later married in 1989. The same year, O'Connor had an abortion after things did not work out with the father. She later wrote the song "My Special Child" about the experience.

Soon after the birth of her daughter Brigidine Roisin Waters on 10 March 1996, O'Connor and the girl's father, Irish journalist John Waters, began a long custody battle that ended with O'Connor agreeing to let Roisin live in Dublin with Waters. In August 2001, O'Connor married British journalist Nick Sommerlad in Wales; the marriage ended in July 2002 after 11 months of marriage. She had her third child, son Shane, in 2004 with musician Donal Lunny. In 2006, she had her fourth child, Yeshua Francis Neil Bonadio, whose father is Frank Bonadio.

O'Connor was married a third time on 22 July 2010, to longtime friend and collaborator Steve Cooney, and in late March 2011, made the decision to separate. Her fourth marriage was to Irish therapist Barry Herridge. They wed on 9 December 2011, in Las Vegas, but their marriage ended after having "lived together for 7 days only". The following week, on 3 January 2012, O'Connor issued a further string of internet comments to the effect that the couple had re-united.

On 18 July 2015, her first grandson was born to her son Jake Reynolds and his girlfriend Lia.

On 7 January 2022, two days after her 17-year-old son Shane was reported missing from Newbridge, County Kildare, he was found dead by the police in Bray, County Wicklow. O'Connor stated that her son, custody of whom she lost in 2013, had been on "suicide watch" at Tallaght Hospital, and had "ended his earthly struggle". O'Connor criticised Ireland's family services agency, Tusla, and the national health authority, the HSE, with regard to their handling of her son's case. Three days later, O'Connor apologised to Tusla, saying "Ok, I’m gonna do the right thing here and apologise for my lashing out. Tusla are working with very limited resources. They loved Shane. They are broken-hearted. They are human. I am sorry I have upset them." She added, "Tusla did their best. We all did: and I am deeply sorry to have blamed anyone." In January 2022, a week after her son's suicide, she was hospitalised on her own volition following a series of tweets in which she indicated she was going to take her own life.

Health
On a 4 October 2007, broadcast of The Oprah Winfrey Show, O'Connor disclosed that she had been diagnosed with bipolar disorder four years earlier, and had attempted suicide on her 33rd birthday on 8 December 1999. Then, on Oprah: Where Are They Now? of 9 February 2014, O'Connor said that she had received three "second opinions" and was told by all three that she was not bipolar.

She has also been diagnosed with complex post-traumatic stress disorder and borderline personality disorder.

In August 2015, she announced that she was to undergo a hysterectomy after suffering with gynaecological problems for over three years. O'Connor would later blame the hospital's refusal to administer hormonal replacement therapy after the operation as the main reason for her mental health issues in the subsequent years, stating "I was flung into surgical menopause. Hormones were everywhere. I became very suicidal. I was a basket case."

Having smoked cannabis for 30 years, O'Connor went to a rehabilitation center in 2016, to end her addiction. O'Connor is an agoraphobic.

In August 2017, O'Connor posted a 12-minute video on her Facebook page in which she stated that she has felt alone since losing custody of her 13-year-old son, Shane, that for the prior two years she had wanted to kill herself, with only her doctor and psychiatrist "keeping her alive". The month after her Facebook post, O'Connor appeared on the American television talk show Dr. Phil on the show's 16th season debut episode. According to Dr. Phil, O'Connor wanted to do the interview because she wanted to "destigmatize mental illness," noting the prevalence of mental health issues among musicians. Shane died in January 2022. A week later, following a series of tweets in which she indicated that she was going to kill herself, O'Connor was hospitalised.

Sexuality
In a 2000 interview in Curve, O'Connor commented, "I'm a dyke... although I haven't been very open about that and throughout most of my life I've gone out with blokes because I haven't necessarily been terribly comfortable about being a big lesbian mule. But I actually am a dyke." However, soon after in an interview in The Independent, she stated, "I believe it was overcompensating of me to declare myself a lesbian. It was not a publicity stunt. I was trying to make someone else feel better. And have subsequently caused pain for myself. I am not in a box of any description."  In a magazine article and in a programme on RTÉ (Ryan Confidential, broadcast on RTÉ on 29 May 2003), she stated that while most of her sexual relationships had been with men, she has had three relationships with women.

Politics
O'Connor is a vocal supporter of a united Ireland, and called on the left-wing republican Sinn Féin party to be "braver". In December 2014 it was reported O'Connor had joined Sinn Féin. O'Connor has called for the "demolition" of the Republic of Ireland and its replacement with a new, united country. She has also called for key Sinn Féin politicians like Gerry Adams to step down because "they remind people of violence", referring to the Troubles.

In a 2015 interview with the BBC, O'Connor wished that Ireland had remained under British rule (which ended after the Irish War of Independence, except for Northern Ireland), because the church took over the country instead. Following the Brexit referendum in 2016, O'Connor wrote on Facebook "Ireland is officially no longer owned by Britain".

Religion
In the late 1990s, Bishop Michael Cox of the Irish Orthodox Catholic and Apostolic Church (an Independent Catholic group not in communion with the Catholic Church) ordained O'Connor as a priest. The Roman Catholic Church considers ordination of women to be invalid and asserts that a person attempting the sacrament of ordination upon a woman incurs excommunication. The bishop had contacted her to offer ordination following her appearance on the RTÉ's Late Late Show, during which she told the presenter, Gay Byrne, that had she not been a singer, she would have wished to have been a Catholic priest. After her ordination, she indicated that she wished to be called Mother Bernadette Mary.

In August 2018, via an open letter, she asked Pope Francis to excommunicate her, as she had asked of Pope Benedict XVI and Pope John Paul II.

In a July 2007 interview with Christianity Today, O'Connor stated that she considers herself a Christian and that she believes in core Christian concepts about the Trinity and Jesus Christ. She said, "I think God saves everybody whether they want to be saved or not. So when we die, we’re all going home... I don't think God judges anybody. He loves everybody equally." In an October 2002 interview, she credited her Christian faith in giving her the strength to live through and overcome the effects of her child abuse.

On 26 March 2010, O'Connor appeared on Anderson Cooper 360° to speak out about the Catholic sexual abuse scandal in Ireland. On 28 March 2010, she had an opinion piece published in the Sunday edition of The Washington Post in which she wrote about the scandal and her time in a Magdalene laundry as a teenager. Writing for the Sunday Independent she labelled the Vatican as "a nest of devils" and called for the establishment of an "alternative church", opining that "Christ is being murdered by liars" in the Vatican. Shortly after the election of Pope Francis she described the office of the Pope as an "anti-Christian office."

O'Connor stated:

Asked whether from her point of view, it is therefore irrelevant who is elected to be Pope, O'Connor replied,

Tatiana Kavelka has written about O'Connor's later Christian work which is "theologically charged yet unorthodox, oriented toward interfaith dialogue and those on the margins."

In October 2018, O'Connor converted to Islam, calling it "the natural conclusion of any intelligent theologian's journey". The ceremony was conducted in Ireland by Sunni Islamic theologian Shaykh Umar Al-Qadri.  She also changed her name to Shuhada' Davitt. In a message on Twitter, she thanked fellow Muslims for their support and uploaded a video of herself reciting the adhan, the Islamic call to prayer. She also posted photos of herself wearing a hijab.

Memoir
O'Connor's memoir, Rememberings, was published in June 2021. Neil McCormick in The Daily Telegraph wrote that it was a "brave, wry new memoir" with "humour and perspective". 'The Guardian wrote that it was a memoir "full of heart, humour and remarkable generosity".

Discography

 1987: The Lion and the Cobra
 1990: I Do Not Want What I Haven't Got
 1992: Am I Not Your Girl?
 1994: Universal Mother
 1997: Gospel Oak (EP)
 2000: Faith and Courage
 2002: Sean-Nós Nua
 2005: Throw Down Your Arms
 2007: Theology
 2012: How About I Be Me (and You Be You)?
 2014: I'm Not Bossy, I'm the Boss
 Upcoming: No Veteran Dies Alone

Awards

|-
| 1989
| The Lion and the Cobra
| Grammy Award for Best Female Rock Vocal Performance
| 
|-
| rowspan="9" | 1990 
| rowspan="2" | Herself 
| Rockbjornen for Best Foreign Artist 
| 
|-
| Billboard Music Awards for Rock Female Artist 
| 
|-
| rowspan="10" | "Nothing Compares 2 U"
| Billboard Music Awards for No.1 World Single 
| 
|-
| MTV Video Music Award for Video of the Year
| 
|-
| MTV Video Music Award for Best Female Video
| 
|-
| MTV Video Music Award for Best Post-Modern Video
| 
|-
| MTV Video Music Award for Breakthrough Video
| 
|-
| MTV Video Music Award for Viewer's Choice
| 
|-
| MTV Video Music Award for International Viewer's Choice (MTV Europe)
| 
|-
| rowspan="10" | 1991
| Grammy Award for Record of the Year
| 
|-
| Grammy Award for Best Female Pop Vocal Performance
| 
|-
| Grammy Award for Best Music Video, Short Form
| 
|-
| rowspan="2" | I Do Not Want What I Haven't Got
| Grammy Award for Best Alternative Music Performance
| 
|-
| Juno Awards for International Album of the Year 
| 
|-
| rowspan="4" | Herself
| Juno Awards for International Entertainer of the Year 
| 
|-
| American Music Award for Favorite Pop/Rock Female Artist
| 
|-
| Brit Award for International Female Solo Artist
| 
|-
| Danish Music Awards for Foreign Female Artist of the Year 
| 
|-
| "Nothing Compares 2 U"
| Danish Music Awards Foreign Hit of the Year 
| 
|-
| 1992
| Year of the Horse
| Grammy Award for Best Music Video, Long Form
| 
|-
| rowspan=3|1994
| "You Made Me the Thief of Your Heart"
| MTV Video Music Award for Best Video from a Film
| 
|-
| rowspan=3|Herself
| Goldene Europa Awards for Best International Singer 
| 
|-
| Žebřík Music Award for Best International Female
| 
|-
| 1995
| Brit Award for International Female Solo Artist
| 
|-
| rowspan=2|1996
| rowspan=2|"Famine"
| Grammy Award for Best Music Video, Short Form
| 
|-
| D&AD Award for Pop Promo Video (Individual)
| style="background:#BF8040"| Wood Pencil
|-
| rowspan=2|2000
| "No Man's Woman"
| Billboard Music Video Award for Best Jazz/AC Clip of the Year
| 
|-
| Herself
| Žebřík Music Award for Best International Female
| 
|-
| rowspan="2" | 2003
| "Troy"
| rowspan="2" | International Dance Music Awards for Best Progressive House/Trance Track 
| 
|-
| "Tears from the Moon"
| 
|-
| 2004
| rowspan="5" | Herself
| rowspan="5" | Meteor Music Awards for Best Irish Female 
| 
|-
| 2005
| 
|-
| 2006
| 
|-
| 2007
| 
|-
| 2008
| 
|-
| rowspan="3" | 2012
| rowspan="2" | "Lay Your Head Down"
| World Soundtrack Award for Best Original Song Written Directly for a Film
| 
|-
| Golden Globe Award for Best Original Song
| 
|-
| "Queen of Denmark"
| Rober Awards Music Poll for Best Cover Version
| 
|-
| 2013
| "GMF" (with John Grant)
| Rober Awards Music Poll for Song of the Year
| 
|-
| rowspan="2" | 2015
| I'm Not Bossy, I'm the Boss
| Meteor Choice Music Prize for Best Album
| 
|-
| "Take Me To Church"
| Meteor Choice Music Prize for Song of the Year
| 
|-
| 2023
| I Do Not Want What I Haven't Got| Choice Music Prize 'Classic Irish Album'
| 
|}

Notes

References

Further reading
 Guterman, Jimmy. Sinéad: Her Life and Music. Warner Books, 1991. .
 Hayes, Dermott. Sinéad O'Connor: So Different''. Omnibus Press, 1991. .

External links

 
 
 

 
Living people
Alternative rock guitarists
Nettwerk Music Group artists
Alternative rock singers
Women guitarists
Feminist musicians
Chrysalis Records artists
Grammy Award winners
Brit Award winners
Bisexual feminists
Bisexual singers
Bisexual songwriters
Bisexual women
LGBT Christian clergy
Bisexual Muslims
Irish LGBT singers
Irish LGBT songwriters
Women Christian clergy
People excommunicated by the Catholic Church
Irish former Christians
Converts to Sunni Islam from Catholicism
Irish Muslims
Irish pacifists
Irish pop singers
Irish priests
Irish rock guitarists
Irish rock singers
Irish women singer-songwriters
Irish women activists
Musicians from Dublin (city)
Muslim pacifists
People educated at Newtown School, Waterford
People from Glenageary
People with borderline personality disorder
People with fibromyalgia
Religious controversies in music
Religious controversies in television
Religious controversies in the United States
Irish-language singers
Formerly missing people
1966 births
20th-century Christian clergy
20th-century Irish women singers
21st-century Irish women singers
20th-century Irish LGBT people
21st-century Irish LGBT people